The Western Australian Land Information Authority operates under the business name of Landgate.

Formerly known as the Department of Land Information (DLI), the Department of Land Administration (DOLA) and the Department of Lands and Surveys (DOLS), it is the statutory authority responsible for property and land information in Western Australia.

Current activities 
Landgate maintains the official register of land ownership and survey information for the 2,645,600 km2 of Western Australia.

The authority provides a wide range of products and services such as Certificates of Title, Property Sales Reports, Survey Plans, aerial photography, satellite imagery, maps and data, and are responsible for valuing the State's land and property for government purposes.

Landgate also provides consultancy services in the areas of survey, valuation (government only), international relations, pastoral and rangelands, and Native Titles.

In order to deliver these services and provide context to the State’s property interests, Landgate coordinates access to location information held across WA government departments through the Western Australian Land Information System (WALIS). This information is made available through an open data platform called the Shared Location Information Platform, or SLIP, which is accessed through the WA Government's open data website, (DataWA).
Landgate also manages the Capture WA program, which coordinates spatial imagery captures on behalf of all state and local government agencies in Western Australia in a bid to reduce costs and duplication.

See also 
 Western Australian Land Information System
 Department of Lands and Surveys, Western Australia
 Surveyor General of Western Australia

References

External links 
 Landgate
 SPUR - better business: Western Australian Land Information System

Government departments of Western Australia
Government agencies established in 2007
2007 establishments in Australia
Land management in Australia